Spilosoma brunneomixta is a moth in the family Erebidae. It was described by Hervé de Toulgoët in 1971. It is found on Madagascar.

References

 

Moths described in 1971
brunneomixta